Infernal Machines is the debut studio album by Darcy James Argue's big band Secret Society. The album was released May 12, 2009 by New Amsterdam Records and was nominated for a Grammy Award.

Reception

The album was praised for its "impressionistic" elements and fresh outlook on jazz orchestra culture. It is credited with "launch[ing Argue] from Brooklyn-based unknown into the international conversation (and touring circuit)".
The AllMusic review stated "Argue's music is a stunning display in diversity within drawn out, developed themes, requiring a keen ear. It's an exceptional example of new jazz music that deserves a broad forum for listening and appreciating". On All About Jazz Troy Collins wrote "Although the halcyon days of the big bands are long past, Infernal Machines stands defiant, updating the big band tradition for the new millennium while presenting exciting possibilities for the future".

Track listing
All compositions by Darcy James Argue

 "Phobos" – 11:02
 "Zeno" – 7:14
 "Transit" – 7:01
 "Redeye" – 10:12
 "Jacobin Club" – 10:55
 "Habeas Corpus (for Maher Arar)" – 10:57
 "Obsidian Flow" – 9:40

Personnel
 Erica von Kleist – winds
 Sam Sadigursky – winds
 Rob Wilkerson – winds
 Mark Small – winds
 Josh Sinton – winds
 Seneca Black – trumpet and flugelhorn
 Laurie Frink – trumpet and flugelhorn
 Tom Goehring – trumpet and flugelhorn
 Nadje Noordhuis – trumpet and flugelhorn
 Ingrid Jensen – trumpet and flugelhorn
 Mike Fahie – trombone
 James Hirschfeld – trombone
 Ryan Keberle – trombone
 Jennifer Wharton – bass trombone
 Sebastian Noelle – acoustic and electric guitar
 Mike Holober – piano and Rhodes electric piano
 Matt Clohesy – contrabass and bass guitar
 Jon Wikan – drums and percussion

References

External links
  Official Site

2009 albums
Darcy James Argue albums